Silvio Rivier is a presenter on Australian television channel SBS who hosted the Global Village (TV series) for its entire run from 1998 to 2015.

Career
Rivier began working at SBS in 1980 and has worked as a subtitler, news reader, voice actor, writer, producer, announcer, narrator, and presenter.

Personal life
Rivier was born in Croatia and immigrated to Australia in 1961.

He has a Diploma in Opera from the Sydney Conservatorium of Music and a degree in Multicultural Journalism from the University of Wollongong. Rivier is a confirmed bachelor.

References

External links 
 Official Global Village website
 Official Thalassa website

Living people
University of Wollongong alumni
Australian television presenters
Year of birth missing (living people)
Subtitlers